Renato Bosatta (born 11 February 1938) is a retired Italian rower. He won a silver medal at the 1960 Summer Olympics and a European title in 1961 in the coxless fours. He then changed to the coxed fours and won a silver medal at the 1964 Summer Olympics and a bronze at the 1964 European Championships. At the 1968 Games he again competed in the coxless fours and won a bronze medal.

References

External links
 

1938 births
Living people
Italian male rowers
Olympic rowers of Italy
Rowers at the 1960 Summer Olympics
Rowers at the 1964 Summer Olympics
Rowers at the 1968 Summer Olympics
Olympic silver medalists for Italy
Olympic bronze medalists for Italy
Sportspeople from the Province of Como
Olympic medalists in rowing
Medalists at the 1968 Summer Olympics
Medalists at the 1964 Summer Olympics
Medalists at the 1960 Summer Olympics
European Rowing Championships medalists